Linxi County is a county in the south of Hebei Province, China, bordering Shandong to the south and east. It is the southernmost county-level division of the prefecture-level city of Xingtai, and is located in its southeast corner.

Administrative divisions
The county administers 5 towns and 4 townships.

Towns:
Linxi, Hexi, Xiabaosi, Jianzhong, Laoguanzhai

Townships:
Lüzhai Township, Yao'anzhen Township, Daliuzhuang Township, Dongzaoyuan Township

Climate

References

External links

County-level divisions of Hebei